Palakollu mandal is one of the 46 mandals in the West Godavari district of the Indian state of Andhra Pradesh. The headquarters is located at Palakollu City. The mandal is bordered by Yelamanchili mandal in the north, Narasapuram mandal in the east, Poduru mandal in the south and Veeravasaram mandal in the west.

Demographics 

 census, the mandal has a population of 258,625 in 48,377 households. The total population consists of 125,535 men and 5,872 women with a sex ratio of 1,010 women per 1000 men. 12,044 children are in the age group of 0–6 years, of which 6,172 are boys and 6,064 are girls with a sex ratio of 951 girls per 1000 boys. The average literacy rate stands at 82.99% with 97,653 literates, of which 50,723 are men and 46,930 are women.

The majority of the population is identified as Scheduled Caste with a population of 27,110, whereas those identified as Scheduled Tribe number 1,218.

Work Profile 

As per the report published by Census India in 2018, 154,149 people are engaged in work activities out of a total population of 258,625. 98,647 workers describe their work as main work, 2,389 as cultivators, 20,355 as agricultural labourers, 2,371  in the household industry and 23,532 involved in other works. Of these, 5,502 are marginal workers.

Administration 

Palakollu mandal is administered under Palakollu (Assembly constituency) of Narsapuram (Lok Sabha constituency) and is one of the twelve mandals that fall under the Narasapuram revenue division.

City and villages 

 census, the mandal has 20 settlements, Witch is Includes 1 City 3 out growths and 17 villages. In Palakollu Mandal.
Palakollu Rural, Poolapalli, and Ullamparru Full OG's to Palakollu (M). Palakollu Rural is the largest and Chandaparru is the smallest village in terms of population.

The settlements in the mandal are listed below:

Note: 
M-Municipality
(OG) denotes an Out Growth

Education 

The mandal plays a major role in the education of rural students in the nearby villages. The primary and secondary school education is imparted by the government in aided and private schools, under the School Education Department of the state. As per the school information report for the academic year 2015–16, the mandal has more than 19,727 students enrolled in over 149 schools.

See also 
 List of mandals in Andhra Pradesh
 Eluru

References

Palakollu
Mandals in West Godavari district